Rosa Bianca Salazar (born July 16, 1985) is a Canadian-American actress. She had roles in the NBC series Parenthood (2011–2012) and the FX anthology series American Horror Story: Murder House (2011). She made her breakthrough as the title character of the film Alita: Battle Angel (2019) and is best known for starring in the series Brand New Cherry Flavor (2021), which she also co-produced.

Salazar appeared in The Divergent Series: Insurgent (2015), Maze Runner: The Scorch Trials (2015), and Maze Runner: The Death Cure (2018) and also appeared in the Netflix films The Kindergarten Teacher (2018) and Bird Box (2018). She stars in the Amazon series Undone (2019–2022).

Early life
Rosa Bianca Salazar was born on July 16, 1985, in British Columbia, Canada to Luis and Marilynne Salazar. Her father is Peruvian and her mother is French-Canadian. She grew up in Washington, D.C. and nearby Greenbelt, Maryland. She attended Greenbelt Middle School and Eleanor Roosevelt High School in Greenbelt, where she was active in the theatre program. She attended Prince George's Community College, where she studied drama, then continued drama studies at Upright Citizens Brigade, where she practiced method acting, improvisation and performance.

Career
Salazar enjoyed entertaining others from the age of fifteen and became serious about becoming an actress after moving to New York City as a young adult. There she appeared in several CollegeHumor sketches. Shortly after relocating to Los Angeles in 2009, she made her film debut playing the character Crystal in Jamesy Boy, written and directed by Trevor White. She then landed recurring roles on two hit TV series: American Horror Story: Murder House and Parenthood. In 2015, she co-starred in various sequels: The Divergent Series: Insurgent as Lynn, and Maze Runner: The Scorch Trials as Brenda.

In 2016, Salazar directed and starred in the short film Good Crazy, a story of a social crusader. It was nominated for a Short Film Grand Jury prize at the Sundance Film Festival.

In 2018, she reprised her role as Brenda in Maze Runner: The Death Cure.

In 2019, she made her major studio lead debut with the film Alita: Battle Angel, an adaptation of the manga Gunnm directed by Robert Rodriguez. It brought Salazar numerous awards, including "Best Visual Effects or Animated Performance" from the Hollywood Critics Association and "Best Voice or Motion Capture Performance" from the Association of Latin Entertainment Critics. That year, it was announced that Salazar would have a main role on the Netflix horror drama miniseries Brand New Cherry Flavor. It was released on August 13, 2021.

Filmography

Film

Television

Video games

References

External links
 

1985 births
Actresses from Maryland
Actresses from Washington, D.C.
Living people
People from Greenbelt, Maryland
Canadian people of Peruvian descent
Canadian film actresses
Canadian television actresses
Canadian video game actresses
Canadian people of French descent
Canadian voice actresses
American film actresses
American television actresses
American video game actresses
American people of French-Canadian descent
American people of Peruvian descent
American voice actresses
Hispanic and Latino American actresses
21st-century Canadian actresses
21st-century American actresses
Canadian emigrants to the United States